Scincinae is a subfamily of lizards. The subfamily contains 33 genera, and the genera contain a combined total of 284 species, commonly called skinks. The systematics is at times controversial. The group is probably paraphyletic. It is one of three subfamilies of the family Scincidae, the other two being Acontinae and Lygosominae.

Genera
The subfamily Scincinae contains the following 35 genera, of which seven are monotypic.

Amphiglossus  (2 species)
Ateuchosaurus  (2 species)
Barkudia  (2 species)
Brachymeles  (42 species)
Brachyseps  (8 species)
Chalcides  (32 species)
Chalcidoceps  (monotypic)
Eumeces  (6 species)
Eurylepis  (2 species) 
Feylinia  (6 species)
Flexiseps  (15 species)
Gongylomorphus  (monotypic)
Grandidierina  (4 species)
Hakaria  (monotypic)
Janetaescincus  (2 species)
Jarujinia  (monotypic)
Madascincus  (12 species)
Melanoseps  (8 species)
Mesoscincus  (3 species)
Nessia  (9 species)
Ophiomorus  (12 species)
Pamelaescincus  (monotypic)
Paracontias  (14 species)
Plestiodon  (50 species)
Proscelotes  (3 species)
Pseudoacontias  (4 species)
Pygomeles  (3 species)
Scelotes  (22 species)
 Scincopus  (monotypic)
 Scincus  (5 species)
Scolecoseps  (4 species)
Sepsina  (5 species)
Sepsophis  (monotypic)
Typhlacontias  (7 species)
Voeltzkowia  (3 species)

References

External links 
 Zipcodezoo.com
 jstage.jst.go.jp
 JCVI.org

Skinks
Taxa named by John Edward Gray